Polyascomyces is a genus of fungi in the family Laboulbeniaceae. This is a monotypic genus, containing the single species Polyascomyces trichophyae.

References

External links
Polyascomyces at Index Fungorum

Laboulbeniomycetes
Monotypic Laboulbeniomycetes genera